Petr Kanderal (16 January 1948 – 28 November 1991) was a Czechoslovakia-born Swiss professional tennis player.

Biography 
An exile from Czechoslovakia, he was based out of Zurich.

Kanderal played in the Davis Cup for Switzerland every year from 1973 to 1978, featuring in a total of 11 ties.

His best performance in a grand slam tournament came as a qualifier at the 1974 Wimbledon Championships, where he made it through to the third round, with wins over Marcello Lara and Bob Giltinan.

See also
List of Switzerland Davis Cup team representatives

References

External links
 
 
 

1948 births
1991 deaths
Swiss male tennis players
Czechoslovak male tennis players
Czechoslovak emigrants to Switzerland
Tennis players from Zürich